The 27th South American Junior Championships in Athletics were held in Santiago, Chile from September 5–7, 1995.

Participation (unofficial)
Detailed result lists can be found on the "World Junior Athletics History" website.  An unofficial count yields the number of about 207 athletes from about 10 countries:  Argentina (33), Bolivia (2), Brazil (62), Chile (51), Colombia (16), Ecuador (14), Paraguay (2), Peru (7), Uruguay (14), Venezuela (6).

Medal summary
Medal winners are published for men and women
Complete results can be found on the "World Junior Athletics History" website.

Men

Women

Medal table (unofficial)

References

External links
World Junior Athletics History

South American U20 Championships in Athletics
1995 in Chilean sport
South American U20 Championships
International athletics competitions hosted by Chile
1995 in youth sport